Sunnycliffs is a locality situated in the Sunraysia region, in north western Victoria, Australia. The locality is predominantly devoted to grape production.

References

Towns in Victoria (Australia)